The term overloading may refer to:
Function overloading, a software engineering process whereby multiple functions of different types are defined with the same name
Operator overloading, a software engineering process whereby operators (e.g. + or -) are treated as polymorphic functions having different behaviors depending on the types of arguments used
Overloading (chess), a tactical theme arising out of an opponent piece performing more than one defensive task in the game
Overloading, in weight training, refers to performing exercises with higher resistance than the muscles can handle, causing microtrauma which leads to hypertrophy or muscle growth

See also
 Overload (disambiguation)
 Overlay (disambiguation)
 Overlap (disambiguation)